The Piper-Price House is a home designed by architect Samuel Sloan. It is located in the Chestnut Hill neighborhood of Philadelphia. It is symmetrical, with a central tower designed to provide a view.

References

External links
 Photo archive of the house

Houses in Philadelphia
Italianate architecture in Pennsylvania
Philadelphia Register of Historic Places